The 1981 Avon Championships of California, also known as the Avon Championships of Oakland,  was a women's tennis tournament played on indoor carpet court at the Oakland Coliseum in Oakland, California in the United States that was part of the 1981 Avon Championships Circuit. It was the 10th edition of the tournament and was held from February 9 through February 15, 1981. Second-seeded Andrea Jaeger won the singles title and earned $24,000 first-prize money.

Finals

Singles

 Andrea Jaeger defeated  Virginia Wade 6–3, 6–1
 It was Jeager's 2nd singles title of the year and the 6th of her career.

Doubles
 Rosemary Casals /  Wendy Turnbull defeated  Martina Navratilova /  Virginia Wade 6–1, 6–4

Prize money

References

External links
 International Tennis Federation (ITF) tournament edition details

Avon Championships of California
Silicon Valley Classic
Avon Championships
Avon Championships of California
Avon Championships of California